Cala Agulla is a beach in Majorca, Spain.

It was declared a Àrea natural d'especial interès in 1991 by the Parliament of the Balearic Islands.

References 

Beaches of Mallorca
Populated places in Mallorca
Beaches of the Balearic Islands